Prato Rio, also known as Hopewell, near Leetown, West Virginia, was the home of General Charles Lee of the Continental Army, for whom Leetown is named. Lee lived there from 1774 to his death in 1782.

Description
Han Yost Hite's original log cabin measured about  square. A second story was added to the log portion in the 19th century. Around 1820 the stone section was partitioned into four rooms, and in 1840 another stone addition was appended to the north end of the stone section.

History
The property was originally acquired in 1731 by Han Yost Heydt (or Hite), who built a log cabin on the property he called "Hopewell". Heydt's son Jacob expanded the cabin in 1733. In 1774 Jacob Heydt sold the  plantation to Lee, who renamed the estate "Prato Rio" (Portuguese, "Stream on the meadow"), but often referred to the house as "The Hut." Inhabiting the extension without partitions, Lee chalked the locations of where walls would have been had they existed. Lee used the log portion as a kitchen, where his servants lived in the loft. Lee lived as a hermit with his dogs, named Father, Son and Holy Ghost, complaining about organized religion and his treatment after his dismissal from the army. After Lee's death the house was further enlarged.

The acreage adjoining the house also had many springs, as indicated by the name Lee chose for his estate. In the early 1930s, the federal government acquired that land and built a coldwater fish hatchery, now operated by the U.S. Geological Survey as the Leetown Science Center, and the U.S.G.S. east coast regional office.

See also
List of the oldest buildings in West Virginia

References

External links

Houses on the National Register of Historic Places in West Virginia
Historic American Buildings Survey in West Virginia
Houses in Jefferson County, West Virginia
Houses completed in 1775
National Register of Historic Places in Jefferson County, West Virginia
Log buildings and structures on the National Register of Historic Places in West Virginia
1775 establishments in Virginia